The Attorney General of Wisconsin is a constitutional officer in the executive branch of the government of the U.S. state of Wisconsin. Forty-five individuals have held the office of Attorney General since statehood. The incumbent is Josh Kaul, a Democrat.

Election and term of office 
The Attorney General is elected on Election Day in November, and takes office on the first Monday of the next January. There is no limit to the number of terms an Attorney General may hold. From 1848 to 1968, the Attorney General was elected to a two-year term in the November general election. Since 1970, following ratification of a constitutional amendment in April 1967, the Attorney General has been elected to a four-year term.

In the event of a vacancy in the office of the Attorney General, the Governor of Wisconsin may appoint a replacement to fill the remainder of the term. The Attorney General may be removed from office through an impeachment trial.  They may also choose to resign from office.

Powers and duties
The Attorney General is the chief law officer of the state of Wisconsin, and amongst other duties has charge and conduct for the state of all suits instituted for and against the government thereof, certifies all bonds issued by the state, protects the School Trust Funds managed by the Wisconsin Board of Commissioners of Public Lands, and provides written opinions on questions of law to either house of the Wisconsin Legislature or the head of any state agency. By virtue of office, the Attorney General directs and supervises the Wisconsin Department of Justice. In accordance with Article X, Section 7 of the Wisconsin State Constitution, the Attorney General is a member of the Wisconsin Board of Commissioners of Public Lands; the same is also a member of, or designates members to, the Claims Board, Crime Victims Rights Board, Group Insurance Board, Joint Survey Committee on Tax Exemptions, Judicial Council, Law Enforcement Standards Board, Public Records Board, and the Board of Directors of the Insurance Security Fund.

List of attorneys general of Wisconsin
This is a list of attorneys general for Wisconsin, from before statehood to present.

Wisconsin Territory
Before statehood, the Wisconsin Territory also had several attorneys general appointed by the governor of the territory.

State of Wisconsin

See also
Wisconsin Board of Commissioners of Public Lands

References

General 
Wisconsin Blue Book, 2005–2006
"Wisconsin as a Territory" from History of Crawford and Richland Counties, Wisconsin.  Springfield, Illinois: Union Publishing Company, 1884. pp. 34–41.

Specific

External links
 Wisconsin Department of Justice official website
 Press releases at Wisconsin Attorney General
 Claims Board
 Wisconsin Insurance Security Fund
 Wisconsin Attorney General articles at ABA Journal
 News and Commentary at FindLaw
 Wisconsin Statutes & Annotations at Law.Justia.com
 U.S. Supreme Court Opinions - "Cases with title containing: State of Wisconsin" at FindLaw
 State Bar of Wisconsin
 Wisconsin Attorney General Brad Schimel profile at National Association of Attorneys General

 
1848 establishments in Wisconsin
Attorney General